José Marcos Torres (born September 24, 1993) is a Venezuelan professional baseball pitcher for the Algodoneros de Unión Laguna of the Mexican League. He has previously played in Major League Baseball (MLB) for the San Diego Padres.

Career

Oakland Athletics
Torres signed as an international free agent with the Oakland Athletics in July 2010. The Athletics began using him exclusively as a relief pitcher during the 2015 season, and he had a 2.56 earned run average in  innings pitched mostly for the Beloit Snappers of the Class A Midwest League, while also making three appearances for the Stockton Ports of the Class A-Advanced California League.

After the 2015 season, the Athletics added Torres to their 40-man roster to protect him from being eligible to be selected in the Rule 5 draft on November 20.

San Diego Padres
The Athletics then traded Torres, Drew Pomeranz, and a player to be named later or cash considerations to the San Diego Padres for Marc Rzepczynski and Yonder Alonso on December 2.

Following the 2016 minor league season, the Padres promoted Torres to the major leagues on September 21. He pitched three innings for the Padres, and was then assigned to the Peoria Javelinas of the Arizona Fall League. 

Torres made the Padres' Opening Day roster in 2017. He was 7-4 with a 4.21 ERA, and shared the major league lead in balks, with three.

He was placed on the MLB restricted list by the Padres in February 2018 as a result of an arrest for a domestic violence incident. On June 8, he was suspended for the remainder of the season without pay for violating MLB's personal conduct policy. On October 4, he was designated for assignment after the season was over, and on October 10, he was released after clearing outright waivers.

Tecolotes de los Dos Laredos
On May 20, 2021, Torres signed with the Tecolotes de los Dos Laredos of the Mexican League. He was released on August 1, 2022.

Algodoneros de Unión Laguna
On January 10, 2023, Torres was traded to the Algodoneros de Unión Laguna of the Mexican League in exchange for Jordan Guerrero.

Legal issues
Torres was arrested in December 2017 and charged with assault with a deadly weapon, criminal damage, and intimidation as a result of a domestic dispute in Phoenix, Arizona.

See also
 List of Major League Baseball players from Venezuela

References

External links

1993 births
Living people
Arizona League Athletics players
Beloit Snappers players
Dominican Summer League Athletics players
Venezuelan expatriate baseball players in the Dominican Republic
El Paso Chihuahuas players
Lake Elsinore Storm players
Leones del Caracas players
Major League Baseball pitchers
Major League Baseball players from Venezuela
San Antonio Missions players
San Diego Padres players
Baseball players from Caracas
Stockton Ports players
Tecolotes de los Dos Laredos players
Venezuelan expatriate baseball players in Mexico
Venezuelan expatriate baseball players in the United States
Vermont Lake Monsters players